The 1985–86 Indiana Hoosiers men's basketball team represented Indiana University. Their head coach was Bobby Knight, who was in his 15th year. The team played its home games in Assembly Hall in Bloomington, Indiana, and was a member of the Big Ten Conference.

The Hoosiers finished the regular season with an overall record of 21–8 and a conference record of 13–5, finishing 2nd in the Big Ten Conference. IU was invited to participate in the 1986 NCAA tournament as a 3-seed; however, IU made a quick exit with a first-round loss to 14-seed Cleveland State.

The season was memorialized and popularized by A Season on the Brink, a 1986 book by John Feinstein. For the book, Bobby Knight granted almost unprecedented access to his team, as well as insights into his private life. The book was well received and is often referred to as "the bestselling sports book of all time." The book and season was later dramatized in a two-hour, made-for-ESPN movie of the same name that first aired in the spring of 2002.

Roster

Schedule/Results

|-
!colspan=8| Regular Season
|-

|-
!colspan=8| NCAA tournament

References

Indiana
Indiana Hoosiers men's basketball seasons
Indiana
1985 in sports in Indiana
1986 in sports in Indiana